Oasis were a British music group, formed in 1984. The group consisted of Peter Skellern, Julian Lloyd Webber, Mitch Dalton, Bill Lovelady and Mary Hopkin.

Their only album, Oasis, was released on the WEA label along with two singles. The album reached No. 23 on the UK Albums Chart after first charting in April 1984; it remained in the charts for 15 weeks.

A tour of the United Kingdom was planned for September 1984, and a new cellist, Audrey Riley, was brought in to replace Lloyd-Webber, whose solo commitments forced him to leave. The tour, however, was brought to an abrupt end when Hopkin fell ill. The group disbanded shortly afterwards.

References

English classical music groups
Musical groups established in 1984
Warner Music Group artists